Eneide di Krypton is a soundtrack album from Italian rock band Litfiba, released in 1983.

The recording was composed by the group to act as a soundtrack to a theatre show of Virgil's Aeneid, staged by the Florentine theatrical company Krypton.

Track listing
"La tempesta" – 2:11
"Approdo sulle coste della Libia" – 16:25
"Il racconto di Enea" – 5:30
"L'incontro d'amore" – 7:15
"La battaglia" – 6:17
"Il canto dei latini" – 2:26

Personnel
Piero Pelù – Vocals
Ghigo Renzulli – Guitars
Renzo Franchi – Drums
Gianni Maroccolo – Bass
Antonio Aiazzi - Keyboards
Sergio Pani - Saxophone

Litfiba albums
1983 albums
Italian-language albums